Kimry (also given as Borki, Kletino)  is an airport in Russia located 8 km to the south of Kimry. It is a small utility airfield and a base for Yak-12/18/52, An-2/26 and L-410 aircraft.

References
RussianAirFields.com

External links
 Homepage of the airport Russian

Airports built in the Soviet Union
Airports in Tver Oblast